Armando Sipoto Bohale Aqueriaco (born 21 April 1988), commonly known as Sipo, is an Equatoguinean footballer who plays as a left back for Spanish club CFI Alicante.

He spent all but his senior career in Spain, but never in higher than Segunda División B. His professional input consisted of a combined nine matches for Pandurii (Romania) and AEK Larnaca (Cyprus).

Born in Spain, Sipo represented the Equatorial Guinea national team.

Club career
Born in Alicante, Spain, Sipo only played lower league football in that country. He represented Alicante CF, CD Badajoz, Cádiz CF, CD Teruel and CA Osasuna B in Segunda División B, and Alicante's B-team (which he helped promote from the regional leagues in his first season), Torrellano Illice CF and FC Jove Español San Vicente in Tercera División.

In 2008–09, Sipo won another promotion with Alicante B but, as the first team was relegated from Segunda División, the former were also forced to drop down a level. He split the 2012–13 campaign with three clubs, playing one Copa del Rey game with Cádiz and also appearing for Teruel and Osasuna's reserves.

Sipo made his professional debut with CS Pandurii Târgu Jiu in Romania. He scored in first appearance in Liga I, a 1–1 away draw against FC Petrolul Ploiești on 29 July 2013.

International career
Born to Equatoguinean parents, Sipo decided to represent Equatorial Guinea internationally. He made his debut on 29 March 2006 in a 2–0 friendly win against Benin in Malabo, being this the first time he entered his adopted nation.

Sipo was called to the squad that appeared in the 2012 Africa Cup of Nations played on home soil, being an unused member during the tournament due to an injury which he contracted in a friendly and from which he did not fully recover.

References

External links

1988 births
Living people
Citizens of Equatorial Guinea through descent
People of Bubi descent
Footballers from Alicante
Equatoguinean footballers
Spanish footballers
Association football defenders
Segunda División B players
Tercera División players
Divisiones Regionales de Fútbol players
Alicante CF footballers
CD Badajoz players
Cádiz CF players
CD Teruel footballers
CA Osasuna B players
CD Olímpic de Xàtiva footballers
Liga I players
CS Pandurii Târgu Jiu players
Cypriot First Division players
AEK Larnaca FC players
Equatorial Guinea international footballers
2012 Africa Cup of Nations players
2015 Africa Cup of Nations players
Equatoguinean expatriate footballers
Spanish expatriate footballers
Expatriate footballers in Romania
Expatriate footballers in Cyprus
Equatoguinean expatriate sportspeople in Romania
Equatoguinean expatriate sportspeople in Cyprus
Spanish expatriate sportspeople in Romania
Spanish expatriate sportspeople in Cyprus